The Optometrists Association Australia (the OAA) is a professional association for Australian optometrists.

The OAA has state branches that work with members to promote and protect the interests of optometrists.

External links
OAA - National Site
OAA - Victorian Site

Medical associations based in Australia
Medical and health organisations based in Australia
1918 establishments in Australia
Eye care in Australia
National Rural Health Alliance organisations
Association